Ahmed Awad may refer to:

 Ahmed Awad Ibn Auf (born 1957), Sudanese politician
 Ahmad Awad bin Mubarak (born 1968), Yemeni politician
 Ahmed Awad (footballer) (born 1992), Palestinian footballer
 Ahmed Awad (judoka) (born 1987), Egyptian judoka